One Man Woman may refer to:

Books and film
One-Man Woman, a 1996 romantic novel by Carole Mortimer
A One Man Woman, a 1925 American comedy short film by Jimmy Callahan
A One Man Woman, a 1991 film directed by David Christensen

Music
One Man Woman, a 2009 album by Shèna

Songs
"One Man Woman" (The Judds song), 1989
"One Man Woman" (Milira song), 1992
"One Man Woman" (Sheena Easton song), 1980
"One Man Woman", by The Temptations from Surface Thrills, 1983 
"One Man Woman", by Carly Simon from Boys in the Trees, 1978 
"One Man Woman", by Mya from Smoove Jones 2016 
"One Man Woman", by Playa featuring Aaliyah; see List of songs recorded by Aaliyah
"One Man Woman", by Wayne Fontana, 1973
"One Man Woman/One Woman Man", by Paul Anka and Odia Coates, 1975